Germany Bridge was a historic Whipple Truss bridge located near Rochester, Fulton County, Indiana.  It was built in 1879 by the Wrought Iron Bridge Co., and spanned the Tippecanoe River.  It was a single span iron bridge on cut stone abutments. It collapsed on October 23, 1979, and was replaced with new span in 1980

It was listed on the National Register of Historic Places in 1978 and delisted in 1980.

References

Truss bridges in the United States
Former National Register of Historic Places in Indiana
Bridges completed in 1879
Transportation buildings and structures in Fulton County, Indiana
Road bridges in Indiana
Wrought iron bridges in the United States
Whipple truss bridges in the United States
1879 establishments in Indiana